Heather Brand (born 17 November 1982) is a Zimbabwean swimmer, who specialised in freestyle and butterfly events. Brand had claimed a total of five medals (three silver and two bronze) at the 2007 All-Africa Games in Algiers, Algeria, and eventually represented her nation Zimbabwe in the 100 m butterfly at the 2008 Summer Olympics. Apart from her medal treasury, Brand also established five long and short-course national records in all butterfly events at a major international competition, spanning three editions of the World Championships.

Brand competed for Zimbabwe in the women's 100 m butterfly at the 2008 Summer Olympics in Beijing. She scored a solid Zimbabwean record of 1:00.61 to capture the 100 m butterfly crown and slide under the FINA B-cut (1:01.43) by nearly a full second at the All-Africa Games one year earlier. Swimming on the outside in heat three, Brand wound up last in a disappointing 1:01.39 to round out the eight-female pack, over two seconds behind the leader Birgit Koschischek of Austria. Brand failed to advance to the semifinals, as she placed forty-second overall out of 49 swimmers in the prelims.

Brand is the former captain of the LSU swimming team and a graduate of wildlife management at the Louisiana State University in Baton Rouge, Louisiana. She is also a resident athlete of King Aquatic Club in Federal Way, Washington, where she trained with numerous world-class swimmers, including Margaret Hoelzer and Megan Jendrick of the United States (both of whom were Olympic medalists), and Svetlana Karpeeva, an individual medley specialist from Russia.

References

External links
Player Bio – LSU Tigers
NBC Olympics Profile

1982 births
Living people
Zimbabwean people of British descent
Zimbabwean female butterfly swimmers
Olympic swimmers of Zimbabwe
Swimmers at the 2008 Summer Olympics
Zimbabwean female freestyle swimmers
LSU Lady Tigers swimmers
Louisiana State University alumni
Sportspeople from Harare
White Zimbabwean sportspeople
African Games silver medalists for Zimbabwe
African Games medalists in swimming
African Games bronze medalists for Zimbabwe
Competitors at the 2007 All-Africa Games